The canton of Saint-Genest-Malifaux is a French former administrative division located in the department of Loire and the Rhône-Alpes region. It was disbanded following the French canton reorganisation which came into effect in March 2015. It consisted of 8 communes, which joined the canton of Le Pilat in 2015. It had 8,681 inhabitants (2012).

The canton comprised the following communes:

Le Bessat
Jonzieux
Marlhes
Planfoy
Saint-Genest-Malifaux
Saint-Régis-du-Coin
Saint-Romain-les-Atheux
Tarentaise

See also
Cantons of the Loire department

References

Former cantons of Loire (department)
2015 disestablishments in France
States and territories disestablished in 2015